The 2013–14 Stuttgarter Kickers season is the 114th season in the club's football history. In 2013–14 the club plays in the 3. Liga, the third tier of German football. It is the club's second season back in this league, having been promoted from the Regionalliga in 2012. The club also takes part in the 2013–14 edition of the Württemberg Cup.

Review and events

Matches

Legend

Friendly matches

3. Liga

League fixtures and results

Tables

League table

Summary table

Württemberg Cup

Team statistics

Squad information

Squad and statistics

 Alexander Loch has no professional contract, he usually play at Stuttgarter Kickers II.
 Tobias Trautner has no professional contract, he usually play at Stuttgarter Kickers U19.

Goal scorers

All competitions

3. Liga

Württemberg Cup

|-
|- align="left" style="background:#DCDCDC"
| colspan="12"|Last updated: 11 May 2014
|-

Penalties

All competitions

3. Liga

Württemberg Cup

|-
|()* = Penalties saved
|- align="left" style="background:#DCDCDC"
| colspan="12"|Last updated: 11 May 2014
|-

Clean sheets

Multi–goal matches

Overview of statistics

Discipline

Bookings

 Alexander Loch has no professional contract, he usually play at Stuttgarter Kickers II.
 Tobias Trautner has no professional contract, he usually play at Stuttgarter Kickers U19.

Suspensions

Transfers

Summer

In:

Out:

|

Winter

In:

Out:

Reserve team
Kickers' reserve team finished 10th in the Oberliga Baden-Württemberg and were coached by Jürgen Hartmann.

Sources

Match reports

Other sources

External links
 2013-14 Stuttgarter Kickers season at Kickersarchiv.de 
 2013–14 Stuttgarter Kickers season at Weltfussball.de 
 2013–14 Stuttgarter Kickers season at kicker.de 
 2013–14 Stuttgarter Kickers season at Fussballdaten.de 

Stuttgarter Kickers
Stuttgarter Kickers seasons